David Botwinik (12 December 1920 – 9 February 2022) was a Lithuanian-born Canadian composer of Yiddish music and music teacher.

Born in Vilna, Central Lithuania, he began his studies at the Yiddish music conservatory in Vilna at around age 13. Shortly before, he studied at the Conservatory of Music Santa Cecilia, Rome. In 1956, he emigrated to Montreal, Canada where he worked as a music teacher and as a choir director of Jewish Peretz School and United Talmud Torahs. For a short time, he published the collection of songs Der nayer dor (The New Generation) and the satirical newspaper Der shmayser (The Spanking).

In 2010, his book From Holocaust To Life (Yiddish: פֿון חורבן צום לעבן, Fun khurbn tsum lebn) was published by the League for Yiddish (New York). This book contains 56 original compositions, including Yiddish Holocaust songs, children's songs and choral compositions, with lyrics by various poets and some by Botwinik himself. In 2017, a CD containing 15 songs was published under the title From Holocaust to Life, Yiddish Art Songs. The CD features internationally acclaimed singers Lisa Willson, John Packard, Ian DeNolfo and Louis Danto. His son, Alexander, a Yiddish language lecturer at the University of Pennsylvania, is producing a second CD of his music including songs from children and adults.

Botwinik died in Montreal on 9 February 2022, at the age of 101.

References

External Links
 Book From Holocaust To Life (Fun khurbn tsum lebn) by David Botwinik, published by the League for Yiddish (New York) – biography included, 
 Holocaust Survivors and Victims Database
 http://www.worldcat.org/oclc/646167730
 http://www.worldcat.org/oclc/982297338
 Biography of David Botwinik
 https://www.yiddishbookcenter.org/collections/oral-histories/interviews/woh-fi-0000215/david-botwinik-2011
 http://www.botwinikmusic.com/old/index.htm
 Pioneers’ Song - Lyrics: Shmerke Kaczerginski. Melody: David Botwinik. Yad Vashem website.
 https://germanic.sas.upenn.edu/people/alexander-botwinik

1920 births
2022 deaths
Lithuanian centenarians
Lithuanian composers
Lithuanian expatriates in Italy
Lithuanian Jews
Men centenarians
Musicians from Vilnius
Soviet emigrants to Canada